Alarm at Station III is a 1939 German crime film directed by Philipp Lothar Mayring and starring Gustav Fröhlich, Jutta Freybe and Kirsten Heiberg. It is set in a Scandinavian country with Prohibition.

The film's sets were designed by the art director Ernst H. Albrecht.

Partial cast
 Gustav Fröhlich as Arne Kolk, Zollwachtmeister
 Jutta Freybe as Elga Dohnert, Braut von Arne Kolk
 Kirsten Heiberg as Kaja, Chansonette
 Walter Franck as Dr. Talverson, Vorsitzender des Prohibitionsvereins
 Berta Drews as Frauke, Frau von Thomas Kolk
 Karl Dannemann as Thomas Kolk
 Hermann Brix as Axel, Sohn von Dr. Talverson
 Aribert Wäscher as Mister Fields, Krimminalkommissar aus Amerika
 Hans Nielsen as Hauptmann Karsten
 Hermann Speelmans as Ströhm, Zollpolizist
 Willi Rose as Bing, Zollpolizist
 Rolf Weih as Dahl, Zollpolizist
 Erik Ode as Egge, Zollpolizist
 Albert Florath as Kommissar Kalmi
 Hans Stiebner as Soot, Schmuggler
 Paul Bildt as Polizeiarzt
 Albert Lippert as Hendrik, Geschäftsführer in der "Teestube"
 Reinhold Bernt as Kai, Schmuggler, Kajas Bruder
 Karl-Heinz Peters as Nikko, Schmuggler
 Wolf Ackva as Holt, Zollpolizist
 Werner Schott as Polizeipräsident
 Rudolf Schündler as Inspektor Henning
 Hermann Pfeiffer as Sörensen, Mitglied des Prohibitionsvereins
 Josefine Dora as Mutter Galen, Cafébesitzerin
 Ewald Wenck as Sergant Galen, Polizeischreiber, Mann v. Frau Galen
 Walter Bechmann as Diener bei Dr. Talverson
 Tina Eilers as Krankenschwester beim Polizeiarzt
 Nicolas Koline as Verhafteter vor dem Polizeigericht
 Klaus Pohl as Lagerverwalter der Allgemeinen Brennstoff A.G.
 Gisela Scholz as Tochter Thomas Kolks
 Peter Dann as Sohn Thomas Kolks

References

Bibliography

External links 
 

1939 films
1939 crime films
German crime films
Films of Nazi Germany
1930s German-language films
Films directed by Philipp Lothar Mayring
Terra Film films
German black-and-white films
1930s German films